A spindle whorl is a disc or spherical to whorled object fitted onto the spindle to increase and maintain the speed of the spin. Historically, whorls have been made of materials like amber, antler, bone, ceramic, coral, glass, stone,  metal (iron, lead, lead alloy), and wood (oak). Local sourced materials have been also used, such as chalk, limestone, mudstone, sandstone, slate, lydite and soapstone.

Gallery

Spinning tools